Puka Pukayuq (Quechua puka red, the reduplication indicates that there is a group or a complex of something, -yuq a suffix to indicate ownership, "the one with a complex of red color", Hispanicized spelling Pucapucayoc) is a mountain in the Andes of Peru, about  high. It is located in the Puno Region, Sandia Province, Limbani District It lies northeast of the peaks of Ariquma, Ankayuq K'uchu and Wirta Pata, and north of a  lake named Ch'uxñaquta ("green lake", Chocñecota).

References 

Mountains of Puno Region
Mountains of Peru